John Vincent Cain (1907–September 1940) was a British civilian aviator, AWOL soldier, convicted petty criminal and confidence man who appeared as an unreliable narrator in newspaper coverage of 1930s European international relations. He may (or may not) have been involved in delivering planes and weapons to both sides of the Spanish Civil War. He was also apparently a passenger on the plane from which Max Wenner fell to his death in 1937. 

Born in 1907, Cain was reportedly educated in a public schools and then began a career flying planes from Brooklands to the Continent for  a week. He later joined the British army, ending up as a lance-corporal in the London Scottish Regiment. Between January and April 1937, John Vincent Cain was, according to himself, involved in providing weapons and planes to Francisco Franco's Nationalists and the opposing Republicans in the ongoing Spanish Civil War. He told the Kingston bankruptcy court in 1938 that "he and another pilot flew American planes from Littoria Aerodrome, Rome, to Spain, where they were sold to the Spanish government and Gen. Franco. He flew other planes from France, but none from England. He was paid by Mr. Drecquer. Cain added that he also took armaments to Spain in a ship chartered by Drecquer at Havre." Nathan Marks Drecquer, of whom little other record can be found, was described as an American financier or "company promoter." According to Cain, Drecquer committed suicide sometime between 1937 and 1938.

A detailed account from within the Sabena airliner from which Wenner fell on 4 January 1937 was provided to a New Zealand newspaper in March 1937 by "Mrs. J. V. Cain, formerly Miss Tinka Jackson, of Devonport, Auckland." Mr. and Mrs. Cain, their daughter and nanny were all traveling together that day. 

In April 1937, Cain ("an Australian") and a British airman named Ken Waller made the newspaper because they used a speedboat to follow the French ocean liner  down Southampton Water and boarded her off the Isle of Wight. They were earlier barred from boarding the ship because "their passports were not visaed for the United States, where they had urgent business."

Cain "was known to many leading fliers as a lavish entertainer," served time twice (for cheque fraud and something involving "share transactions"), and declared bankruptcy in 1938. Detective-Sergeant Broom told the bankruptcy court in April 1938 that Cain was "so full of deceit he almost deceives himself" and that "this man is extremely fond of luxury and seems unable to adjust his mode of living to his circumstances."

In 1940, John Vincent Cain shot himself in the head in front of two police detectives who were coming to investigate why he had told a woman (but not the wife he had in 1937) he was going to shoot her, put her in the body in the car, and set fire to it. After Cain's public suicide it was reported, "Cain, who was a lance-corporal in a London regiment, had been absent from his unit for some time. Scotland Yard was interested in his recent activities, and Special Branch officers visited the neighbourhood, but it is officially denied that Cain was engaged in espionage." He had told the woman he threatened to kill that, variously, he had an important job with the Air Ministry, he had a dangerous job and thus needed a revolver, two of his friends who were said to have committed suicide were actually killed by German agents, England was presently being invaded on three fronts, he was a German, he'd had important machinery (or a set of stolen plans) from Birmingham that had already been sent to Germany, and that he would be flying to Germany soon in a plane hidden in a field or that he needed to go to "an open field in a certain area" where a German plane would pick him up.

A 1946 book called They Came to Spy by Stanley Firmin mentions Cain as an example of "the sort of thing Intelligence officers in Britain had to deal with."

See also
 Harold Cole
 Fritz Joubert Duquesne
 Sidney Reilly
 Battle of Britain
 Bristol Blitz
 Liverpool Blitz
 London Blitz
 Hull Blitz
 International response to the Spanish Civil War

References

1907 births
1940 suicides
British fraudsters